The 1970–71 South Carolina Gamecocks men's basketball team represented the University of South Carolina during the 1970–71 men's college basketball season. South Carolina won the ACC tournament championship, defeating North Carolina in the championship game 52-51. This was the last season South Carolina ever played in the ACC. The success South Carolina achieved on the court brought resentment and anger from fellow ACC schools, especially those on "Tobacco Road," as the conference members of the state of North Carolina were known. The hostility of the road crowds, the unfriendly behavior of coaches and athletic directors in the conference, and the discrepancies in eligibility standards led head coach Frank McGuire to support South Carolina becoming an Independent before the 1971-72 season. Despite South Carolina leaving the ACC in 1971, (as of 2018) they still remain the only school in the state of South Carolina to win an ACC tournament championship, even though Clemson, still remains in the ACC.

Roster

Schedule

Rankings

Gamecocks drafted into the NBA

References

South Carolina Gamecocks men's basketball seasons
South Carolina
South Carolina
South Carolina
South Carolina